First-seeded Jaroslav Drobný defeated Frank Sedgman 6–2, 6–0, 3–6, 6–4 in the final to win the men's singles tennis title at the 1952 French Championships.

Seeds
The seeded players are listed below. Jaroslav Drobný is the champion; others show the round in which they were eliminated.

  Jaroslav Drobný (champion)
  Frank Sedgman (final)
  Dick Savitt (quarterfinals)
  Ken McGregor (semifinals)
  Tony Trabert (fourth round)
  Eric Sturgess (semifinals)
  Budge Patty (quarterfinals)
  Gardnar Mulloy (quarterfinals)
  Mervyn Rose (fourth round)
  Rolando Del Bello (fourth round)
  Ham Richardson (fourth round)
  Felicisimo Ampon (quarterfinals)
  Giovanni Cucelli (fourth round)
  Irvin Dorfman (fourth round)
  Enrique Morea (second round)
  Grant Golden (second round)

Draw

Key
 Q = Qualifier
 WC = Wild card
 LL = Lucky loser
 r = Retired

Finals

Earlier rounds

Section 1

Section 2

Section 3

Section 4

Section 5

Section 6

Section 7

Section 8

External links
 

1952
1952 in French tennis